Bradford District High School is a public, English-language secondary school located in Bradford, Ontario.  It is managed by the Simcoe County District School Board. The principal is David Brooks. The school has an enrollment of about 1,100. During the last half of the 2006–2007 school year BDHS underwent extensive renovations that included a new greenhouse and full expansion and renovation of existing facilities.

The school offers a construction-oriented apprenticeship program offering students to learn about hands-on labour and the real experiences of working in that field.

BDHS serves the town of Bradford West Gwillimbury and portions of Innisfil. Elementary feeder schools include:
Chris Hadfield Public School
Cookstown Central Public School
Fieldcrest Elementary School
Fred C. Cook Public School
Harvest Hills Public School
Honorable Earl Rowe Public School
Marshview Public School
Harvest Hills Public School
Sir William Osler Public School
WH Day Elementary School

See also
List of high schools in Ontario

References

High schools in Simcoe County
1857 establishments in Ontario
Educational institutions established in 1857